Francis Henry Morice (1851 in La Colle, Canada – 19 June 1912 in Dunedin, Otago) was a New Zealand cricketer. He played 4 first-class matches for Wellington.

Born in Canada, Morice was educated in England and Germany before moving to New Zealand in 1867. He worked from 1872 to 1892 as a police officer. At his sudden death of heart failure he was carrying out his duties as district agent for the Public Trustee and Official Assignee in Dunedin. He left a widow and several children.

References

External links
Cricinfo

1851 births
1912 deaths
Canadian cricketers
New Zealand cricketers
Wellington cricketers
New Zealand people of Canadian descent
Burials at Dunedin Southern Cemetery
Cricketers from Quebec
People from Montérégie